Mopsolodes is a genus of South Pacific jumping spiders that was first described by Marek Michał Żabka in 1991.  it contains only two species, found only in Australia and Papua New Guinea: M. australensis and M. furculosus. The name is derived from the closely related genus Mopsus.

References

External links
 Diagnostic drawings of M. australensis

Salticidae genera
Salticidae
Spiders of Asia
Spiders of Australia